The four-state area or quad-state area, is the area where the states of Arkansas, Kansas, Missouri, and Oklahoma almost touch: Arkansas and Kansas share no boundary.  The Tulsa, Oklahoma; Joplin, Missouri; and Fayetteville–Springdale–Rogers, Arkansas, metropolitan areas are located within the region.  Notable cities and towns in the area are Tulsa and Miami, Oklahoma; Pittsburg, Kansas; Joplin, Springfield, and Monett, Missouri; and Fayetteville, Springdale, Rogers, and Bentonville, Arkansas.

The area is partially located in the Ozarks. Oil and gas production, as well as coal mining were and continue to be a large part of the region's industry. Today, a major driver of the region's economy is Walmart, the world's largest retail company, whose headquarters are in Bentonville. Also headquartered nearby in Northwest Arkansas are Tyson Foods, the world's largest processor of chicken, beef, and pork (Springdale); and major trucking and transportation company J. B. Hunt (Lowell). The city of Joplin, Missouri, is the most centrally located city in the four-states area.

Media
Outside of Tulsa, the largest city in the four-states area by far, the area is covered primarily by two television markets. The Joplin–Pittsburg market covers the region’s counties in Missouri, Ottawa County, Oklahoma (the only county in Northeastern Oklahoma that is not designated as part of the Tulsa market) as well as most of Southeastern Kansas, with the exclusion of Chautauqua and Montgomery counties (which are also in the Tulsa DMA). It is served by KOAM-TV (channel 7, CBS; the station’s call letters stand for Kansas, Oklahoma, Arkansas, and Missouri), KFJX (channel 14, Fox/CW+), KSNF (channel 16, NBC), KODE-TV (channel 12, ABC), and KOZJ (channel 26, PBS; part of the two-station Ozarks Public Television regional member network).

The Fort Smith market covers the counties in northwest Arkansas; however, the NBC affiliate for that market, KNWA-TV, is licensed to Rogers, while a translator for ABC affiliate KHBS and one of the stations of the Arkansas PBS member network, KAFT, are in Fayetteville. The majority of the households in the market are served by stations in the Tulsa, Oklahoma metropolitan area, including KOTV (CBS), KTUL (ABC), KJRH-TV (NBC), and KOKI-TV (Fox).

Education
There are several universities located in the four states.  Missouri Southern State University and Missouri State University are located in Joplin and Springfield respectively.  Pittsburg State University is located in Pittsburg.  Coffeyville Community College is located in Coffeyville.  Northeastern Oklahoma A&M College is located in Miami. The University of Tulsa and Oral Roberts University are located in Tulsa.  The University of Arkansas is located in Fayetteville, Arkansas.

Naming
Industries use the term to describe the region as a whole – businesses often name themselves Four State __ to attempt to describe the area they wish to serve.  Interstates 44, 49, 540 and US Highways 60, 62, 69, 71, 166, 169, 400, and 412 serve the area.  The historic Route 66 also runs through the region.

See also
 Tri-state area
 Four Corners

References

Regions of Arkansas
Regions of Kansas
Regions of Missouri
Regions of Oklahoma